Elena Tsagrinou (born November 16, 1994) is a Greek singer. Tsagrinou began her career as the lead singer of the Greek band OtherView, until beginning a solo career in 2018. She represented Cyprus in the Eurovision Song Contest 2021 with the song "El Diablo", finishing in 16th place.

Life and career 

Tsagrinou was born on November 16, 1994 in Athens. From a young age, Tsagrinou was involved in music and attended a Music High School. In 2009, she participated in the Greek adaption of the Got Talent franchise from ANT1, Ellada Eheis Talento. Tsagrinou has a younger sister, Villy, born in 1998.

2013–2018: OtherView, Just the 2 of Us and The Voice of Greece 

In the summer of 2013, she was auditioned by the band OtherView (after Crystallia's withdrawal from the band) for the position of the lead singer and thus signed a contract with the record company Feelgood Records. On 8 January 2014, they released their first track entitled "What You Want", with lyrics and music by themselves and Gabriella Ellis. A few months later, they released their second track, entitled "O giros tou kosmou" (Around the World), which surpassed "What You Want" in views. The lyrics were written by Vassilis Koumentakos, as the music was composed by him, with the participation of Dimitris Isaris. At the same time, Tsagrinou participated in the music show of Mega Channel, Just the 2 of Us (the Greek adaption of the talent show Just the Two of Us) as coach of Ivan Svitailo.

In 2015, the band released four new tracks. "Dikaiosi" with Arva, "Ola Afta Pou Niotho", "In The Club Bi**h" and "Se Thelo Tora". The music of the songs was written mainly by them while the lyrics were written by Vassilis Koumentakos. In 2016, the tracks "Xana" and "Emeis Mazi" were released. The second was in collaboration with Goin' Through and was the soundtrack of the movie "The Bachelor". In the same year they appeared on MADWalk together with Josephine and Maria Korinthiou. In the 2016–2017 season, Tsagrinou was the backstage presenter on SKAI's talent show, The Voice of Greece, while as a band they made live appearances at BOX Athens with Melisses and Josephine.

In 2017, as a band, they announced their withdrawal from Feelgood Records and the collaboration with Panik Records. They even released two tracks with their own lyrics and music: "Asto Se Mena" and "Tora I Pote", while they appeared in two awards. At the MAD Video Music Awards, performing the song "Kane Me" in a remix with rapper Mike and the Cypriot Super Music Awards. They also participated in MADWalk - The Fashion Music Project and MTN MADWalk Cyprus.

In the 2017–2018 season, they appeared at the Fantasia Live nightclub with Josephine and then made some appearances with Konstantinos Argyros at Club Vogue in Thessaloniki. In the same year, they participated in MADWalk - The Fashion Music Project, performing "Havana" by Camila Cabello together with Thomai Apergi. In the middle of the same year, Tsagrinou announced her withdrawal from OtherView, after completing five years of collaboration, in order to pursue a solo career.

2018–present: Solo career and Eurovision Song Contest 
After her withdrawal from OtherView, she started the preparations for her first personal album, while in June 2018, she appeared at the MAD Video Music Awards, performing a remix of Panos Kiamos' track "Thelo Na se Xanado" with Bo. At the same time, she started appearances at the Fantasia Live nightclub with Konstantinos Argyros and Nino.

On 1 July 2018, she released her first solo track, entitled "Pame Ap' Tin Arhi", which a little later was released in English, as "Summer Romance". The lyrics were written by Nikos Moraitis while the music by Dimitris Kontopoulos. On 23 October of the same year, she released her second solo track, entitled "Paradeisos", with lyrics & music by ARCADE. On 6 December, the song "Ela tin protochronia" was released together with Elias Vrettos, Giorgos Kartelias, Elina Papila, Bo, REC, OGE and the radio station 104.8fm of Chalkida, with the aim of financially strengthening the voluntary, non-profit organization for special care and protection of mother and child, Ark of the World.

In the winter season 2018-2019 she made live appearances at the Fantasia Live nightclub with Konstantinos Argyros, Demy, 719 The Band, Andromache and George Livanis.

In April 2019, she participated in MADWalk - The Fashion Music Project, performing with Dakis the song "Tsai me Lemoni".

In June of the same year, she appeared at the MAD Video Music Awards performing the song "San Lava" with OGE.

On 2 November 2019, her third solo song was released, entitled "Logia" with lyrics and music by Leonidas Sozos. Also, in the same month, she started live appearances at BOX Athens with Melisses, Tamta & Matina Zara for the 2019–2020 season. In July 2020 she released her fourth solo song entitled "Amore" and a collaboration with Mike, entitled "Pare Me Agkalia". Also, in the summer of the same year, she performed at the nightclub Posidonio Music Hall with Panos Kiamos, Anastasios Rammos and Tania Karra.

On 25 November 2020, it was announced that she will represent Cyprus at the Eurovision Song Contest 2021, in Rotterdam, the Netherlands, with the song "El Diablo".

Personal life
From to 2017 to 2022, Tsagrinou had been in an on-off relationship with Greek rapper Mike. In April 2022, Tsagrinou confirmed her relationship with DJ Stephan.

Discography

Compilation albums

Singles

Lead

Promotional

Videography

Filmography

Television

Film

References 

1994 births
21st-century Greek women singers
Eurovision Song Contest entrants for Cyprus
Eurovision Song Contest entrants of 2021
Greek pop singers
Living people
Singers from Athens
Panik Records artists